West Hartlepool Town Hall is a municipal building in Raby Road, Hartlepool, County Durham, England. The town hall, which was the meeting place of West Hartlepool County Borough Council, is a Grade II listed building.

History
The development of West Hartlepool was an initiative of Ralph Ward Jackson, who founded the West Hartlepool Dock Company and opened the Coal Dock to the south west of Old Hartlepool in 1847. By the 1880s West Hartlepool was over twice the size of Old Hartlepool and the Town Improvement Commissioners decided to procure a town hall dedicated to West Hartlepool: the site they selected was open land to the west of Hart Lane (subsequently renamed Raby Road).

The foundation stone for the new building was laid by Councillor George Pyman on 18 December 1895. It was designed by Henry Cheers in the English Gothic style, built in red brick with stone dressings and was officially opened as West Hartlepool Town Hall on 1 October 1897. It was built in conjunction with a technical college which was located immediately to the west and was completed about the same time. The design, which followed a long cruciform layout, involved a symmetrical main frontage with a single wide bay, flanked by turrets with spires, facing onto Raby Street; it featured an arched porch which slightly projected forward and was decorated with carved spandrels and battlements. There was a tall five-light window with the town's coat of arms in the tympanum on the first floor and a gable above. Internally, the principal room was the assembly hall which featured a proscenium arch. West Hartlepool became a county borough, with West Hartlepool Town Hall as its headquarters, in 1902.

The assembly hall was used as a public venue and concert performers included the contralto singer, Kathleen Ferrier, who sang in Handel's Messiah in the town hall on 15 December 1948. It continued to serve as the headquarters of West Hartlepool County Borough Council and, after 1967, when West Hartlepool County Borough amalgamated with the Old Hartlepool Borough Council, it served as the headquarters of the new combined authority until the new Civic Centre was built in Victoria Road in the mid-1970s. The technical school was demolished and the town hall converted for use as a theatre in 1977. The town hall remained in use as a theatre after a schedule of refurbishment works was completed in 1994.

Notes

References

Government buildings completed in 1897
City and town halls in County Durham
Buildings and structures in Hartlepool
Grade II listed buildings in County Durham